Mikke Louhela (born 29 May 1997) is a Finnish professional footballer who plays for SalPa, as a midfielder.

References

1997 births
Living people
Finnish footballers
Åbo IFK players
FC Inter Turku players
Kaarinan Pojat players
Salon Palloilijat players
Kakkonen players
Veikkausliiga players
Association football midfielders